Krod may refer to:

 Francisco Rodríguez (baseball, born 1982), a Venezuelan Major League Baseball player, nicknamed "K-Rod".
 KROD (AM), a talk radio station in El Paso, Texas.
 Kröd Mändoon and the Flaming Sword of Fire, a British-American  comedic sword and sorcery television series.